Baldassare Longhena (1598 – 18 February 1682) was an Italian architect, who worked mainly in Venice, where he was one of the greatest exponents of Baroque architecture of the period.

Biography
Born in Venice, Longhena studied under the architect Vincenzo Scamozzi and after Scamozzi's death completed his monumental Procuratie Nuove in St. Mark's Square, a complex of imposing residences and offices for officials of the Venetian Republic that gives the square its appearance today.

His best-known work is the elegantly decorated Basilica di Santa Maria della Salute begun in 1631 to thank the Virgin for the city's deliverance from the plague. This two domed church on the peninsula between the Canal Grande and the Zattere is one of the city's best-known landmarks. The main entrance, modeled on the Roman triumphal arch, was later copied in successive churches and cathedrals, in Venice and elsewhere.

He designed many other churches in the city, among them the Chiesa dell'Ospedaletto and Santa Maria di Nazareth built between 1656 and 1680, although the façade of the latter church was designed by Giuseppe Sardi (1624–1699). He also designed the Palazzo Belloni Battagia and the Palazzo Giustiniani Lolin, both facing the Canal Grande.

One of his largest designs was the Chioggia Cathedral, executed between 1624 and 1647. On the completion of the cathedral he designed two other palaces on the Grand Canal of Venice, Ca' Rezzonico and Ca' Pesaro, both completed after his death.

Between 1641 and 1680 he designed the new library, the grand staircase, the monastery façade, the Novitiate building, the sick-room and the guest-rooms of the San Giorgio Maggiore monastery.

Baldassare Longhena died at Venice in 1682.

Critical reception
Longhena developed the style of his master Vincenzo Scamozzi and Andrea Palladio. As Branko Mitrovic states in his book on renaissance architecture: "Scamozzi...adjusted the central intercolumnation of the main portico so that the edges of columns can be seen from the end of a circular hall. Visually, this is a way to suggest from inside that there is another formal space beyond the entrance door... Baldassare Longhena used a similar system of non-orthogonal axes in Santa Maria della Salute in Venice. As with Palladio, it is unclear whether Longhena intended to form such visual axes or whether they are a by-product of his complex geometries."

Gallery

References

Frank, Martina, Baldassare Longhena, (Studi di arte veneta. 8), Venice 2004
Andrew Hopkins, Baldassare Longhena, Milan, 2006

1598 births
1682 deaths
Republic of Venice architects
17th-century Italian architects
Italian Baroque architects